Mavişehir is a station on İZBAN's Northern Line in İzmir. Mavişehir is one of the new stations constructed by İZBAN. The station was built to serve the high rise complex of Mavişehir.

Railway stations in İzmir Province
Railway stations opened in 2010
2010 establishments in Turkey
Karşıyaka District